A sonic boom is a shockwave caused by an aircraft or other object travelling faster than sound.

Sonic boom may also refer to:

Sonic the Hedgehog
 Sonic Boom (TV series), a 2014 computer-animated TV series based on the Sonic the Hedgehog video game franchise
 Sonic Boom: Rise of Lyric, a 2014 video game for the Wii U
 Sonic Boom: Shattered Crystal, a 2014 video game for the Nintendo 3DS
 Sonic Boom: Fire & Ice, a 2016 sequel to Shattered Crystal for the 3DS
 Sonic the Hedgehog Boom: The Music from Sonic CD and Sonic Spinball, a 1994 video game soundtrack album 
 "Sonic Boom", the theme tune in the American release of the 1993 video game Sonic the Hedgehog CD

Music
 Sonic Boom (Kiss album), a 2009 album by hard rock-band Kiss
 Sonic Boom (Lee Morgan album), a 1979 album by jazz trumpeter Lee Morgan
 "Sonic Boom" (song), a 2021 single by Lead
 "Sonic Boom", a song by Roy Woods, from the album Waking at Dawn
 "Sonic Boom", a song by the rock band Gear Daddies from their 1990 album Billy's Live Bait
 Sonic Boom Six, a UK rock band
 Peter Kember, a British musician more commonly known as Sonic Boom
 Sonic Boom, a 2012 album by pianist Uri Caine
 Sonic Boom Records, an independent record store in Seattle, Washington

Other
Sonic Boom (1987 video game), a scrolling shooter released for various platforms
Sonic Boom, an attack move by Guile from the Street Fighter franchise
Sonic Boom, a music store and frequent meeting place for characters of the TV series Austin & Ally